Katikati is a town in New Zealand (North Island) located on the Uretara Stream near a tidal inlet towards the northern end of Tauranga Harbour, 28 kilometres south of Waihi and 40 kilometres northwest of Tauranga. State Highway 2 passes through the town; a bypass scheduled to have begun construction in 2008 is on hold.

Katikati has become known for its many murals painted on walls of commercial buildings. These were started in the 1990s to regenerate tourist interest in the town and district, and led to the town being recognised New Zealand's 'Most Beautiful Small Town' award for towns of less than 8,000 population in 2005 by the Keep New Zealand Beautiful Society.

In 2018, Katikati was named "Avocado Capital of New Zealand .  Besides its avocado orchards, there are many kiwi-fruit orchards in and around Katikati.

There are hot springs three kilometres to the south of Katikati at Sapphire Springs.

History and culture

Pre-European history

Katikati was a Maori community that derived from the waka Mātaatua and is affiliated with the tribal group in Tauranga, Ngāi Te Rangi. It was later settled in 1875 by Ulster Scots people  from County Tyrone in Ireland through the Orange Institution.

European settlement

The land upon which the town was built was taken from local Māori after the New Zealand Wars and was given to the settlers by the Central Government. The settlement was established by the Englishman George Vesey Stewart, who led two groups of mostly Irish settlers there aboard the ships Carisbrook Castle (1875) and Lady Jocelyn (1878).

The settlement was formed from two distinct groups: "the settlers useful" (tenant farmers) and "the settlers ornamental" (those with wealth). The settlement managed to withstand early economic problems and developed into a healthy town, based around farming and agriculture. In the latter 19th century, the kauri gum digging trade became an important industry in the area. Katikati was one of the southernmost areas where the gum could be found, as it is close to the historical southern limit for where kauri trees could thrive.

Marae

There are two marae in the Katikati area.

Te Rere a Tukahia Marae and its Tamawhariua meeting house are affiliated with the Ngāi Te Rangi hapū of Ngāi Tamawhariua.

Tuapiro Marae and its Ngā Kurī a Wharei meeting house are affiliated with the Ngāti Ranginui hapū of Ngāti Te Wai.

Transport 
Katikati is situated on State Highway 2. There are proposals to bypass Katikati with an upgrade including two roundabouts.

Katikati was previously on the East Coast Main Trunk railway line. The railway closed in September 1978 when the Kaimai Tunnel opened. The railway from Apata through to Paeroa remained in place until 1980. There were proposals to keep the section of railway from Apata to Katikati before it was dismantled.

Demographics

Katikati had a population of 5,010 at the 2018 New Zealand census, an increase of 915 people (22.3%) since the 2013 census, and an increase of 1,386 people (38.2%) since the 2006 census. There were 2,034 households, comprising 2,382 males and 2,625 females, giving a sex ratio of 0.91 males per female. The median age was 53.1 years (compared with 37.4 years nationally), with 795 people (15.9%) aged under 15 years, 693 (13.8%) aged 15 to 29, 1,596 (31.9%) aged 30 to 64, and 1,923 (38.4%) aged 65 or older.

Ethnicities were 78.7% European/Pākehā, 11.5% Māori, 5.8% Pacific peoples, 11.4% Asian, and 1.1% other ethnicities. People may identify with more than one ethnicity.

The percentage of people born overseas was 28.3, compared with 27.1% nationally.

Although some people chose not to answer the census's question about religious affiliation, 43.4% had no religion, 36.5% were Christian, 1.0% had Māori religious beliefs, 3.4% were Hindu, 0.2% were Muslim, 0.7% were Buddhist and 6.2% had other religions.

Of those at least 15 years old, 492 (11.7%) people had a bachelor's or higher degree, and 1,071 (25.4%) people had no formal qualifications. The median income was $22,800, compared with $31,800 nationally. 255 people (6.0%) earned over $70,000 compared to 17.2% nationally. The employment status of those at least 15 was that 1,377 (32.7%) people were employed full-time, 546 (13.0%) were part-time, and 105 (2.5%) were unemployed.

Education

Notable people

 Alan Edward Mulgan, journalist, writer, and broadcaster
 Bunny Walters, singer
 Richard O'Brien, actor, director, and producer
 Dave Gallaher, rugby player

References

External links 

Katikati History Website
Katikati Website
Katikati Mobile App
Katikati College
Katikati Primary
Matahui Primary

Western Bay of Plenty District
Populated places in the Bay of Plenty Region
Populated places around the Tauranga Harbour